The title Cardinal-Infante may refer to any one of the following, each of them both an infante (prince) and a cardinal:

 Cardinal-Infante Jaime of Portugal (1433–1459)
 Cardinal-Infante Afonso of Portugal (1509–1540)
 Henry of Portugal (1512–1580), Cardinal-Infante (1545–1578), Cardinal-King of Portugal (1578–1580)
 Cardinal-Infante Ferdinand of Austria (1609–1641), Spanish-born political and military figure
 Cardinal-Infante Luis of Spain (1727–1785)

See also 
 Cardinal-nephew Ranuccio Farnese, referred to as il cardinalino ("the little cardinal") due to his young age at appointment
 Crown cardinal, the overall practice of creating cardinals from European royalty
Cardinal protector
Lay cardinal